Abdurrahman "Rock" ibn Ramadan Ya-Sin (born May 23, 1996) is an American football cornerback who is a free agent. He played college football at Presbyterian, before transferring to Temple. He was drafted by the Indianapolis Colts in the second round of the 2019 NFL Draft.

High school career 
Ya-Sin attended Southwest DeKalb High School in Decatur, Georgia. He was ranked as a two-star recruit and committed to Presbyterian on February 5, 2015.

College career 
After Presbyterian decided to move to a non-scholarship conference in the FCS, Ya-Sin transferred mid-year to Temple. After recording 44 tackles, two tackles-for-loss, two interceptions, and 12 pass breakups, Ya-Sin was selected to play in the 2019 Senior Bowl.

Professional career

Indianapolis Colts

2019 season 
Ya-Sin was drafted by the Indianapolis Colts in the second round with the 34th overall pick in the 2019 NFL Draft.
In Week 11 against the Jacksonville Jaguars, Ya-Sin recorded his first career interception off a pass thrown by Nick Foles in the 33–13 win. Ya-Sin was named to Pro Football Focus’ All-Rookie Team.

2020 season 
Ya-Sin switched his jersey number to 26 before the season, stating he wanted "a new beginning." He was inactive against the Minnesota Vikings in week 2 due to a stomach illness.

In Week 11 against the Green Bay Packers, Ya-Sin recorded his first interception of the season off a pass thrown by Aaron Rodgers during the 34–31 overtime win.

Las Vegas Raiders
On March 16, 2022, Ya-Sin was traded to the Las Vegas Raiders in exchange for Yannick Ngakoue.

References

External links
Las Vegas Raiders bio
Presbyterian Blue Hose bio
Temple Owls bio

1996 births
Living people
People from Decatur, Georgia
Players of American football from Georgia (U.S. state)
Sportspeople from DeKalb County, Georgia
American football cornerbacks
Presbyterian Blue Hose football players
Temple Owls football players
Indianapolis Colts players
Las Vegas Raiders players